Ang Thong Province Stadium is a multi-purpose stadium in Ang Thong Province, Thailand. It is currently used mostly for football matches and is the home stadium of Angthong F.C. The stadium holds 10,000 people.

References

Football venues in Thailand
Multi-purpose stadiums in Thailand
Angthong F.C.